5/8 may refer to:

 the calendar date August 5 of the Gregorian calendar
 the calendar date May 8 (USA)
 The Fraction five eighths or 0.625 in decimal
 A time signature of quintuple meter in music
 Five-eighth, a position in rugby league football